The N2 is a national route in South Africa that runs from Cape Town through George, Gqeberha, East London, Mthatha, Port Shepstone and Durban to Ermelo. It is the main highway along the Indian Ocean coast of the country. Its current length of  makes it the longest numbered route in South Africa.

Prior to 1970, the N2 designation only applied to the route from Cape Town to Durban.

Route 

Major towns and cities along the route of the N2 include Cape Town, Somerset West, Caledon, Swellendam, Mossel Bay, George, Knysna, Plettenberg Bay, Humansdorp, Port Elizabeth, Grahamstown, Qonce (formerly King William's Town), Bhisho, East London, Mthatha, Kokstad, Port Shepstone, Durban, KwaDukuza, Empangeni, Piet Retief and Ermelo.

Western Cape 
Cape Metropole
The N2 begins in central Cape Town at the northern end of Buitengracht Street (M62), outside the entrance to the Victoria & Alfred Waterfront. The first section of the N2 is shared with the beginning of the N1; it is a four-lane elevated freeway that runs along a strip of land between the city centre and the Port of Cape Town. On the eastern edge of the city centre the two roads split, and the N2 turns south as Nelson Mandela Boulevard, crossing above the yards and approach tracks of Cape Town railway station.

Leaving the Central Business District (CBD), the N2 descends to ground level after the R102 Christiaan Barnard on-ramp in Woodstock. Continuing roughly east-southeast, the N2 intersects a few roads in the Woodstock area, most notably Roodebloem Road, which provides access to the M4 Main Road and University Estate, located on the north-western slopes of Devil's Peak. After leaving the Woodstock area, the N2 meets the M3 Phillip Kgosana Drive, from the southern City Bowl. Atop Mowbray Ridge in Observatory, these two roads merge into a massive 10-lane highway and bend around the University of Cape Town Medical Campus and Groote Schuur Hospital before splitting at the bottom of the ridge, with the M3 running toward the University of Cape Town and the Southern Suburbs. This intersection, called Hospital Bend, was the scene of frequent bottlenecks and accidents due to the lack of pre-selection lanes. However, this stretch of road has been extensively upgraded and made safer.

After Hospital Bend, the N2 turns east as Settler's Way and forms the border between Observatory and Mowbray, intersecting Main Road, Liesbeek Parkway, the M5 Black River Highway, and Raapenberg Road. These intersections are in very close proximity and are the source of congestion on this stretch of road. However, the closing of intersections (especially that with Main Road) was deemed undesirable due to the negative impact this would have on businesses. After leaving the Southern Suburbs, the N2 travels across the Cape Flats as a 6-lane freeway towards Somerset West. It travels just past the southern end of the main runway at Cape Town International Airport, crosses the M7 and R300 highways (both of which link the N2 with Mitchells Plain in the south and Bellville and Brackenfell in the north). After the R300, the N2 becomes a 4-lane freeway, passing nearby Khayelitsha and Macassar. It enters the Helderberg region where it passes through Somerset West and is reduced to an undivided highway after the R44 intersection, which links the N2 with Stellenbosch and the Winelands. Here it passes through several intersections with traffic lights, which cause frequent congestion. After Somerset West, it bypasses Strand, Gordon's Bay, and Sir Lowry's Pass Village.

Overberg

After Sir Lowry's Pass Village, the N2 climbs Sir Lowry's Pass to enter the Overberg region. It passes near the town of Grabouw on the Hottentots-Holland plateau before descending the Houwhoek Pass to Botrivier. It then passes across the agricultural plains through the towns of Caledon, Riviersonderend, Swellendam and Riversdale to re-approach the coast at Mossel Bay, which marks the beginning of the Garden Route.

Garden Route

Just west of Mossel Bay, the N2 again becomes a divided freeway, and remains one as far as the intersection with the N9/N12 just outside George. From there, it travels across Kaaiman's Pass to Wilderness and on to Knysna and Plettenberg Bay. After Plettenberg Bay, a section of the road is tolled as the Tsitsikamma Toll Route, primarily because of the Bloukrans Bridge (crossing the Bloukrans River). An alternative route used to run through Nature's Valley but this was closed in 2007 after flood damage. The Bloukrans Bridge marks the border with the Eastern Cape.

Eastern Cape 
After crossing the Bloukrans Bridge, the N2 becomes the Sunshine Coast Road, passing through the Southern edge of the Tsitsikamma Nature Reserve, and regains freeway status between Nompumelelo and Witsiebos. It runs eastward as a 2-lane single carriageway highway, bypassing the resort towns of Jeffreys Bay and St. Francis Bay, as well as the town of Humansdorp. The bridges along the intersections of the regional roads with the N2 have widened decks, which indicate the ambitions of future dualling of the entire stretch of the N2 between Nompumelelo and Colchester. It becomes a 4-lane dual carriageway freeway at the Van Stadens Bridge, which marks its entrance into the Nelson Mandela Bay Municipality, the third-largest metropolis along the N2. It proceeds eastwards to the city of Gqeberha (formerly Port Elizabeth).

Nelson Mandela Bay

After the Van Stadens Bridge, the N2 meets the R102, which provides an alternative route to KwaNobuhle and Kariega (formerly Uitenhage) via the R334. It then enters Gqeberha as a 4-lane dual carriageway freeway. It runs eastward past the suburbs of Kabega Park and Tulbargh before making a north-easterly turn just after the R102 Kragga Kamma Road/Cape Road intersection in More Grove. It then bypasses the suburbs of Newton Park and Korsten before meeting the R75 at the Commercial Road Intersection, with the R75 linking to the Gqeberha city centre in the south and to Kariega and Graaff-Reinet in the north.

It then passes through northern Sidwell, intersecting Kempston Drive (which links with the New Brighton and KwaZakhele suburbs in the north), and the M4 Settlers Way Highway (which links the N2 with the CBD and Chief Dawid Stuurman International Airport in the south and the industrial areas of Deal Party in the north). The N2 then leaves the city of Gqeberha running northwards toward Colchester, adjacent to the Indian Ocean, first passing across the estuarine area of the Swartkops River before meeting the R335 (which provides access to Motherwell) and bypassing the Coega Special Economic Zone (SEZ), with a major intersection with Neptune Road linking the harbour with the N2. It loses freeway status after the R334 Addo South Gate intersection, and becomes a 2-lane single-carriageway highway after Colchester.

After Colchester, the N2 leaves the Nelson Mandela Bay Metropolitan Municipality and turns north-eastwards, moving away from the coast towards Grahamstown; just after Colchester, the N2 meets the southern terminus of the N10 (which heads northwards towards Middelburg and eventually Namibia).

After passing around Grahamstown (also known as Makhanda) on a bypass, the N2 passes through the former Ciskei, including Peddie, to enter the Buffalo City Metropolitan Municipality.

Buffalo City (Qonce- East London)

At Qonce (King William's Town) in Buffalo City, it meets the R63 and after several traffic-light intersections, the N2 turns east-southeast towards the coast, meeting it at East London.

The N2 becomes a 4-lane dual carriageway road after leaving Qonce, and regains freeway status at the La Rochelle Street intersection in Berlin, just outside East London. It runs past Fort Jackson and the Mdantsane township. It then enters the city of East London as it passes to the north of Amalinda. After the M4 Amalinda Main Road intersection, it runs north of Vincent, intersecting the M1 Western Avenue (which links the CBD to the outlying rural areas situated along the Nahoon River). It then descends into the Nahoon River Valley, meeting the N6 after crossing the Nahoon River. The N2 then passes through Beacon Bay, partially intersecting the M8 Beacon Bay Road, and exits the city of East London before bypassing Gonubie to the north of the city. The N2 then becomes a 2-lane single-carriageway highway after the R102 Main Road intersection (Gonubie Interchange) which is also the proposed start of the Wild Coast Toll Road (which is to run for  towards Port Edward). It then continues as a freeway until shortly after the Brakfontein intersection, after which it leaves the Buffalo City Metro.

After East London, the N2 turns again towards the interior in a northeasterly direction to avoid the difficult terrain of the Wild Coast. It passes through the former Transkei and its former capital, Mthatha (there are plans for the N2 to run as a 4-lane dual carriageway highway from Viedgesville to the Ngqeleni Village turn off, bypassing Mthatha to the south, as part of the N2 Wild Coast Toll Road). After passing Mthatha, the N2 continues north-east through the towns of Qumbu, Mount Frere (KwaBhaca) and Mount Ayliff. Near Kokstad, the N2 climbs Brook's Nek to enter the province of KwaZulu-Natal.

KwaZulu-Natal 
The N2 enters KwaZulu-Natal atop Brooks Nek, after which it bypasses Kokstad to the south. This is also where the N2 meets the R56 from Matatiele. The N2 then runs east-south-east past the rural towns of Harding and Izingolweni, to enter Port Shepstone from the west through its suburb of Marburg, meeting the north-eastern terminus of the R61 Highway at the Oribi Toll Plaza. This interchange with the R61 is to be the eastern end of the N2 Wild Coast Toll Route from East London via Mthatha and Port Edward.

The N2 then turns to the north at the Oribi Toll Plaza, becoming a highway (taking over from the R61). It passes through the rural areas of Southern KwaZulu-Natal, with the rural towns of Mthwalume, Umzinto and Dududu, and the resort towns of Pennington, Park Rynie and Scottburgh lying to the west and east of the N2, respectively.

eThekwini Metropolitan Area (Durban)

It runs past the towns of Umkomaas and Umgababa, before entering the urban area of eThekwini at Kingsburgh and Amanzimtoti. It runs past Isipingo and the old Durban International Airport, before splitting from the M4 at Umlazi; the M4 provides alternative highway access to the Durban CBD. After the M4 interchange, the N2 runs as an 8-lane dual carriageway freeway around the city of Durban known as the Outer Ring Road, passing through the suburbs of Mobeni, Chatsworth, Sarnia, Ridgeview and Chesterville, with the M1 Higginson Highway intersection and the M7 Solomon Mahlangu Drive interchange providing access to these suburbs as well as the town of Queensburgh (In the future, these intersections will be converted into free-flowing interchanges to accommodate the traffic that will arise from the new Durban dig-out port, which will be situated where the defunct Durban International Airport is).

After leaving Chesterville, the N2 meets the N3 Highway at the EB Cloete Interchange (locally known as Spaghetti Junction) at Westville, the only 4-level stack interchange in South Africa (until the completion of the N1/R300 Stellenberg Interchange near Cape Town). It then passes through the suburbs of Clare Hills and Reservoir Hills, meeting the M19 Umgeni Drive at a large intersection just outside of Reservoir Hills. It then continues northwards past Parlock, Riverhorse Valley, Briardene and Sea Cow Lake, with the M43 Queen Nandi Drive and the R102 KwaMashu Highway providing access to these places, thereafter exiting the city of Durban and continuing towards Cornubia and uMhlanga, meeting the M41 at the Mount Edgecombe Interchange where the Durban Outer Ring Road ends.

It then runs to the east of Verulam and to the west of eMdloti, passing by the King Shaka International Airport in La Mercy. The airport off-ramp marks the beginning of the KwaZulu-Natal North Coast Toll Road. After the airport, it is tolled at oThongathi, before leaving eThekwini.

After eThekwini, the N2 runs toward Mtunzini, passing through Ballito before being tolled again at the Mvoti Toll Plaza before KwaDukuza (formerly Stanger). It meets the R74 near KwaDukuza. It then continues as a 4-lane single carriageway highway and passes through sugar cane plantations on the KwaZulu-Natal North Coast. It is tolled for the final time at Mtunzini and meets the R34, which provides access to Richards Bay to the east and Empangeni and Ulundi to the west. Just after Empangeni, the N2 ceases to be a dual carriageway. After Richards Bay, the N2 turns north, moving away from the coast into the heart of Zululand, where it bypasses Greater St Lucia Wetlands Park to the west (where the R618 provides access) and runs past the town of Mkuze before turning to the north-west and running close to the border of Eswatini, passing the town of Pongola.

Mpumalanga 
After leaving Pongola, the N2 makes a direct line for Piet Retief (eMkhondo) and meets the R33 to be co-signed with it as the main road through the town centre before splitting 12 km north of the town. It then heads north-west to Ermelo, where it terminates at the N11 at the corner of Voortrekkerlaan and De Emigratie Street in the town centre, just south of the N11's intersection with the N17.

Toll Plazas 
Toll plazas on the N2 include:

Tsitsikamma Toll Route 
Tsitsikamma Toll Plaza, near Nature's Valley (includes ramp toll plazas)

South Coast Toll Route 
Oribi Toll Plaza, Port Shepstone (includes ramp toll plazas)
Umtentweni Ramp Toll Plaza, Port Shepstone

North Coast Toll Route 
King Shaka Ramp Toll Plaza, near King Shaka International Airport
oThongathi Toll Plaza, near oThongathi (includes ramp toll plazas) – toll services temporarily suspended 
Mvoti Toll Plaza, near KwaDukuza
Mandini Ramp Toll Plaza, near Mandini 
Dokodweni Ramp Toll Plaza, Dokodweni (near Gingindlovu) 
Mtunzini Toll Plaza, Mtunzini (includes ramp toll plazas)

Disruption to route 
Heavy rains in 2006 triggered a mud-slide on the Kaaiman's pass section of the N2 between George and Wilderness. This caused the road to be temporarily closed from 26 August. As a result of the slide, a section of roadway sagged and large cracks appeared on the road surface. After an inspection by a team of engineers a single lane was reopened on 29 August for vehicles with a gross mass of under .

An alternative route following the Saasveld road was put into use, but this road only allows for a single lane of traffic and light vehicles. Heavy vehicles have to take an alternative route via the R62 and Langkloof pass effectively lengthening the distance from George to Wilderness from 11 to over 60 km (6.8 to 38 mi). The road has since reopened.

Traffic on the N2 has also been disrupted on numerous occasions because of protests. On 10 September 2007, residents of Joe Slovo Informal Settlement blockaded the N2 Freeway in Cape Town near Langa. Police responded with rubber bullets, injuring over 30 residents.  On 4 December 2008, a few thousand residents of eMachambini, between KwaDukuza  and Richards Bay in KwaZulu-Natal, blockaded the N2 Freeway in protest against the proposed AmaZulu World Themepark. Police opened fire and injured about 23 residents and arrested about 10.

On 20 October 2012, a section of the N2 was closed after heavy rainfall caused a collapse about  outside Grahamstown.

Planned Wild Coast realignment (N2WCTR) 
As of 2018, there are plans to realign the N2 National Route from Port Shepstone to Mthatha, on a shorter stretch of road, and designate the entire stretch between Port Shepstone and East London as a toll road. As at 2022, these plans are still in the process of being completed. It is scheduled for completion in 2024 and this new N2 route will take over the entire section of the current R61 Route from Port Shepstone to Mthatha, with realignment between Port Edward and Lusikisiki (providing a shorter stretch of road between the two towns).

This new route, known as the Wild Coast Toll Route (N2WCTR), will extend from East London (Gonubie Interchange) to Port Shepstone (Oribi Toll Plaza) and extend further north-east through Park Rynie to the Isipingo Interchange, south of Durban. There will be two new "greenfields" sections, one between Port St. John's and Lusikisiki, and the other between Lusikisiki and Port Edward. The latter greenfields section will provide a shorter and more direct route between Port Edward and Lusikisiki while the current R61 passes through Flagstaff and Bizana on route between the two towns. The greenfields sections will include two new toll plazas, namely the Mthentu Toll Plaza between Lusikisiki and Port Edward, and the Ndwalane Toll Plaza just outside of Port St. Johns. The stretch from East London to Mthatha will also have two toll plazas installed: the Ngobozi Toll Plaza just north of the Great Kei Bridge and the Candu Toll Plaza just north-east of Idutywa.

In this project, there are also plans to widen the N2 from Port St. Johns to East London to a 4-lane undivided highway. The new greenfields section between Lusikisiki and Port Edward will also include a 4-lane undivided highway, with a 4-lane dual carriageway through Lusikisiki. Bypasses around the towns of Butterworth (Gcuwa), Idutywa and Mthatha are to be constructed after the completion of the new toll road. According to Traveller24, this new route will be around  shorter than the current N2 (and 69 km shorter than the current R61) and will be a faster route by about 3 hours for heavy vehicles (1½ hours for light vehicles). The old N2 route passing through Harding, Kokstad and KwaBhaca would then be designated as the R102.

As of 2021, some road signs on the Port Shepstone to Port Edward section of the R61 have already been changed to signs indicating the N2. Also, as of 2021, parts of the road in the Eastern Cape are under construction.

South Africa's road agency, SANRAL, also initially planned to do some work on the existing  section of the N2 Highway from Port Shepstone to Durban as part of this project, including installing toll plazas at Park Rynie (midway between Port Shepstone and Durban; just north of the R612 off-ramp) and at Isipingo (in the southern part of Durban; where the Durban Outer Ring Road begins). SANRAL received opposition from the eThekwini Metropolitan Municipality council as well as several businesses in the area over the proposed Isipingo Toll Plaza due to concerns over expenses for drivers in South Durban and traffic in the same area. Several companies in the area, led by Toyota South Africa, took SANRAL to court, and the proposed Isipingo tollgate was cancelled. However, SANRAL has said that the tolling of the N2 South Coast Highway will be considered "in the foreseeable future".

See also 

National Roads in South Africa
The N2 Gateway Housing Project along the N2 freeway in Cape Town

References

External links 

N2 Wild Coast Toll Route Construction Updates

Highways in South Africa
 
National Roads in South Africa
Roads in Cape Town
Roads in South Africa
Toll roads in South Africa
Transport in Durban
Transport in Port Elizabeth